During the 2003–04 English football season, Wimbledon F.C. competed in the First Division. This was Wimbledon's last season before changing its club name to Milton Keynes Dons after being given permission by the Football League.

Season summary
Wimbledon entered administration in June 2003, and played their first match at the National Hockey Stadium in Milton Keynes in September. Although crowds improved at the club's new base, the administrator sold any player who could command a transfer fee and Murdoch's team finished bottom. The club was brought out of administration at the end of the season, and subsequently rebranded as Milton Keynes Dons.

Final league table

Results
Wimbledon's score comes first

Legend

Football League First Division

FA Cup

League Cup

Players

First-team squad
Squad at end of season

Left club during season

References

Notes

Wimbledon F.C. seasons
Wimbledon